Foe is an upcoming science fiction thriller film directed by Garth Davis, based on the novel of the same name by Iain Reid.

Premise
The lives of a married couple are turned upside down when a stranger arrives at their farm and informs the husband he will be sent to a large space station, and his wife will be left in the company of someone else.

Cast
Paul Mescal as Junior, the central character and narrator
Saoirse Ronan as Henrietta, Junior’s wife
Aaron Pierre as Terrance, a stranger

Production
It was announced in June 2021 that Garth Davis would be directing the film in addition to co-writing with the author of the novel, Iain Reid. Saoirse Ronan, Paul Mescal and Lakeith Stanfield were announced to star. In October, Aaron Pierre was cast to replace Stanfield.

Filming began in Melbourne in January 2022 and wrapped in South Australia in April 2022.

Release
Amazon Studios entered negotiations for the distribution rights in July 2021.

References

External links
Foe at the Internet Movie Database

Upcoming films
Films shot in Melbourne
Australian science fiction films